The Struve Geodetic Arc is a chain of survey triangulations stretching from Hammerfest in Norway to the Black Sea, through ten countries and over , which yielded the first accurate measurement of a meridian arc.

The chain was established and used by the German-born Russian scientist Friedrich Georg Wilhelm von Struve in the years 1816 to 1855 to establish the exact size and shape of the earth. At that time, the chain passed merely through three countries: Norway, Sweden and the Russian Empire. The Arc's first point is located in Tartu Observatory in Estonia, where Struve conducted much of his research. Measurement of the triangulation chain comprises 258 main triangles and 265 geodetic vertices. The northernmost point is located near Hammerfest in Norway and the southernmost point near the Black Sea in Ukraine.

In 2005, the chain was inscribed on the World Heritage List, because of its importance in geodesy and its testimony to international scientific cooperation. The World Heritage site includes 34 commemorative plaques or built obelisks out of the original 265 main station points which are marked by drilled holes in rock, iron crosses, cairns, others. This inscription is located in ten countries, the second most of any UNESCO World Heritage after the Ancient and Primeval Beech Forests of the Carpathians and Other Regions of Europe.

The measurements of the 30° Meridian Arc in 1816- 1852 as well the description of the geodesic, topographical, and map making works in the Balkans from the nineteenth century until the beginning of the twentieth century by Russian Czarist Army was described in Astronomy, geodesy and map- drawing in Moldova since the middle ages till the World War I.

Chain

Norway
Fuglenes in Hammerfest
Raipas in Alta
Luvdiidcohkka in Kautokeino
Baelljasvarri in Kautokeino

Sweden
"Pajtas-vaara" (Tynnyrilaki) in Kiruna
"Kerrojupukka" (Jupukka) in Pajala
Pullinki in Övertorneå
"Perra-vaara" (Perävaara) in Haparanda

Finland
Stuor-Oivi (currently Stuorrahanoaivi) in Enontekiö
Avasaksa (currently Aavasaksa) in Ylitornio
Torneå (currently ) in Tornio
Puolakka (currently Oravivuori) in Korpilahti
Porlom II (currently Tornikallio) in Lapinjärvi
Svartvira (currently Mustaviiri) in Pyhtää

Russia
"Mäki-päälys" (Mäkipäällys) (Finland 1917/1920-1940) in Gogland (Suursaari)()
"Hogland, Z" (Gogland, Tochka Z) in Gogland

Estonia
"Woibifer" (Võivere) in Väike-Maarja Parish
"Katko" (Simuna) in Väike-Maarja Parish
"Dorpat" (Tartu Old Observatory) in Tartu.

Latvia
"Sestu-Kalns" (Ziestu) in Ērgļu novads
"Jacobstadt" in Jēkabpils

Lithuania
"Karischki" (Gireišiai) in Panemunėlis
"Meschkanzi" (Meškonys) in Nemenčinė
"Beresnäki" (Paliepiukai) in Nemėžis

Belarus
"Tupischki" (Tupishki) in Ashmyany district
"Lopati" (Lopaty) in Zelva district
"Ossownitza" (Ossovnitsa) in Ivanovo district
"Tchekutsk" (Chekutsk) in Ivanovo district
"Leskowitschi" (Leskovichi) in Ivanovo district

Moldova
"Rudi" near Rudi village, Soroca district

Ukraine
Katerynivka in Antonivka, Khmelnytsky Oblast
Felshtyn in Hvardiiske, Khmelnytsky Oblast
Baranivka in Baranivka, Khmelnytsky Oblast
Staro-Nekrasivka (Stara Nekrasivka) in Nekrasivka, Odesa Oblast

Results

Historical
At publication in 1858, the flattening of the earth was estimated at one part in 294.26.

In 2005, the work was repeated using satellite navigation.

Modern
Northernmost point: Hammerfest (Fuglenes): 70° 40' 11.23″ N

Southernmost point: Ismail (Staro-Nekrassowka): 45° 20' 02.94″ N

Difference in Geodetic Latitude: 25° 20' 08.29″

Distance in kilometres: 2,821.853 ± 0.012

See also
 Paris meridian

References

External links

Listing on UNESCO website
A UNESCO article about the chain
FIG – Proposal to UNESCO for the Struve Geodetic Arc to become a World Heritage Monument
J.R. Smith. The Struve Geodetic Arc
Latvia Struve arc webpage
Estonian souvenir sheet and first day cover dedicated to Struve and Struve Geodetic Arc (2011)

 
Geodetic surveys
Tartu
Väike-Maarja Parish
World Heritage Sites in Belarus
World Heritage Sites in Estonia
World Heritage Sites in Finland
World Heritage Sites in Latvia
World Heritage Sites in Lithuania
World Heritage Sites in Moldova
World Heritage Sites in Norway
World Heritage Sites in Sweden
World Heritage Sites in Russia
World Heritage Sites in Ukraine
Struve family